Yang Xin may refer to:

 Yang Xin (art historian) (1940–2020), Chinese art historian
 Yang Xin (politician) (born 1950), Chinese politician
 Yang Xin (footballer) (born 1994), Chinese footballer
 Yang Xin (murder victim), decapitated by Zhu Haiyang

See also
Yangxin (disambiguation)